Aimirgein mac Amalgado, Irish poet, fl. 678x683.

A member of the Déisi Muman, Aimirgein was the composer of the Old Irish law-text Cáin Fuithir Be.

References

 A New History of Ireland Volume VIII: A Chronology of Irish History to 1976: A Companion to Irish History, Part I, .

7th-century Irish poets
Irish male poets